Hatfields & McCoys is a 2012 American three-part Western television miniseries based on the Hatfield–McCoy feud produced by History channel. The two-hour episodes aired on May 28, 29, and 30, 2012.

Cast and characters

Main

Recurring

Production
The miniseries was History'''s first aired scripted drama (the network had previously produced a scripted miniseries in 2011, The Kennedys, but decided against airing it in the United States).

Although the story is set in the Appalachians in West Virginia and Kentucky, the miniseries was shot in Romania, just outside Brașov with the Carpathians standing in for the Appalachians.

Music
The score for the series was composed by John Debney and Tony Morales, with additional music by Kevin Costner and Modern West.  The soundtrack features vocals performed by Lisbeth Scott on The Long Road Down.

Reception
On Rotten Tomatoes, the series holds an approval rating of 71% based on 24 reviews, with an average rating of 7.34/10. The site's critical consensus reads: "Hatfields and McCoys is a violent and gritty spectacle that perhaps takes itself too seriously." On Metacritic, the film has a weighted average score of 68 out of 100, based on 20 critics, indicating "generally favorable reviews".

Linda Stasi of the New York Post commented:Entertainment Weekly Ken Tucker gave the series a B+, stating: "In stretching the tale over three nights, the pacing sags at times, and recriminations can get repetitive. It also doesn't help that Reynolds shot the miniseries in that perpetual sepia tone that gives everything a faux-antique look. But overall, Hatfields & McCoys is engrossing, and enlightening about a feud that proves to be a lot more than the bumpkin brawl of pop legend." Mary McNamara of the Los Angeles Times wrote:

Among the negative critics was Verne Gay of Newsday who called the series "violent and dull", adding:Washington Posts Hank Stuever also gave a negative review:

Ratings
Part one drew the largest ever ratings for a History program and one of the biggest in cable TV history. 13.9 million viewers tuned into the first of three parts, making it the most-watched single broadcast on ad-supported cable ever, excluding sports.  Demographic numbers were high as well, with 4.8 million viewers in the adults 18-49 demographic and 5.8 million viewers among adults 24-54. Part two was watched by 13.13 million viewers with an adult 18-49 rating of 3.7, the highest rated programming on cable of the night. Part three was watched by 14.29 million viewers with an adult 18-49 rating of 4.0, making it the number-one program of the night.

AccoladesHatfields & McCoys received 16 nominations at the 64th Primetime Emmy Awards, the most since the History Channel began operations.

Home video release
The series was released on DVD and Blu-ray Disc formats on July 31, 2012. The bonus material includes a music video of "I Know These Hills" from Kevin Costner and Modern West from their album Famous for Killing Each Other: Music From and Inspired By Hatfields & McCoys''.

Effect on tourism
According to WYMT-TV in Hazard, Kentucky, the series has generated an increase in tourism to the area from people wanting to know about the feud. Pike County Tourism Vice Chair Reed Potter said,

References

External links
 
 The Story of the McCoys Barry McCoy Author, Hatfield McCoy Feud Historian and Official Spokesperson for the McCoy Family. The Story of the McCoys 
 
 TV series on Hatfield-McCoy feud aims for accuracy

2012 American television series debuts
2012 American television series endings
2010s American drama television miniseries
American biographical series
History (American TV channel) original programming
Primetime Emmy Award-winning television series
Television shows filmed in Romania
Television shows set in Kentucky
Television shows set in West Virginia
Works about feuds